Special When Lit is a feature length documentary film about pinball written and directed by Brett Sullivan. The film is produced by Steam Motion and Sound.

Production
Filming took place from mid-2006 to 2008 in several trips to the U.S., France, Italy, Sweden, Australia and the UK. Post production was completed at Steam Motion and Sound in London during 2008 and 2009.

Synopsis
The pinball industry made more money than the American film industry during the 1950s through the 1970s. Special When Lit explores the former pop icon of the pinball machine, and through interviews with fans, collectors, designers and champion players from across the globe, traces pinball's history through to the present day.

Recognition
Eye for Film wrote "It's not the sort of subject that you'd think would suit a documentary, but it works surprisingly well." It "offers fascinating insights and makes for an enjoyable watch. Special When Lit is reminiscent of that other great documentary Spellbound. Both draw the audience into a world of obsession, impress upon you the level of devotion, and charm you with the people in that world"

Tallahassee Democrat wrote that the film was a "surprisingly compelling documentary".

Chicago Sun-Times called the film a "significant flick in a lineup that runs the gamut from light to heavy religious to political".

Raindance Film Festival director Elliot Grove wrote that the documentary was "masterfully shot" and that its director, Brett Sullivan, was able to bring out a certain nostalgia in his film that was both intriguing and fascinating, with its interviews like "an emotional and sensitive area, with pinball’s fans describing of the game like a relationship, their faces lighting up as if they were recounting their first kiss."  He found the winning film to be "encapsulating and absorbing."

The Montana Kaimin wrote "With a gripping intro, the film draws you in and keeps your attention with its larger-than-life characters."

Awards and nominations
 2009, Won Best Feature Documentary at Los Angeles United Film Festival
 2009, Nominated for Best Documentary at Raindance Film Festival
 2009, Nominated for Best Documentary at Tallahassee Film Festival
 2010, Won Audience Award for Best Feature Documentary at London United Film Festival

Release and distribution
First premiered in October 2009 at London's Raindance Film Festival where it was nominated for Best Documentary.
Subsequent festivals included: Hot Springs Documentary Film Festival, Atlanta International Documentary Film Festival, Big Sky Documentary Film Festival, Calgary International Film Festival, Buffalo Niagara International Film Festival, Bronx International Film Festival, Indianapolis International Film Festival, Da Vinci Film Festival, Tallahassee Film Festival, Los Angeles United Film Festival, USA Film Festival, and Wisconsin Film Festival.

The film was picked up by PBS International Distribution for worldwide sales outside the United States.  The film was released on DVD and Blu-ray in January 2011. The Documentary Channel in the United States premiered Special When Lit 21 May 2011. The PBS Channel in the UK premiered Special When Lit 5 November 2011.

Interviewees

 Roger Sharpe
 Rick Stetta
 Sam Harvey
 Steve Epstein
 Gary Stern

 Lyman Sheats Jr.
 Tim Arnold
 Josh Kaplan
 John Broughton
 Pat Lawlor

 Steve Ritchie
 Steve Kordek
 Steve Keeler
 Raphael Lankar
 Koi Morris
 Al Thomka

References

External links
 Special When Lit at the Internet Movie Database
 
 Steam Motion and Sound Production Company

2009 films
2009 documentary films
British independent films
British documentary films
Works about pinball
2009 independent films
2000s English-language films
2000s British films